Pokali waterfall is located in Okhaldhunga district of Nepal draining to the Likhu river.  With a fall height of 130 m, it is considered second tallest fall of Nepal. 

There is a Madhav temple near the waterfall which is visited by the hindus of surrounding districts.   An annual festival is conducted near the waterfall to promote tourism  as it is considered as one of the potential site for touristic activities.

See also
List of waterfalls of Nepal

References

Waterfalls of Nepal